The 1964 NCAA Men's Ice Hockey Tournament was the culmination of the 1963–64 NCAA men's ice hockey season, the 17th such tournament in NCAA history. It was held between March 19 and 21, 1964, and concluded with Michigan defeating Denver 6-3. All games were played at the University of Denver Arena in Denver, Colorado.

Qualifying teams
Four teams qualified for the tournament, two each from the eastern and western regions. The ECAC tournament champion and the WCHA tournament champion received automatic bids into the tournament. Two at-large bids were offered to one eastern and one western team based upon both their tournament finish as well as their regular season record.

Format
The ECAC champion was seeded as the top eastern team while the WCHA champion was given the top western seed. The second eastern seed was slotted to play the top western seed and vice versa. All games were played at the Meehan Auditorium. All matches were Single-game eliminations with the semifinal winners advancing to the national championship game and the losers playing in a consolation game.

Bracket

Note: * denotes overtime period(s)

Semifinals

Denver vs. Rensselaer

Providence vs. Michigan

Consolation Game

Providence vs. Rensselaer

National Championship

Denver vs. Michigan

All-Tournament Team

First Team
G: Bob Gray* (Michigan)
D: Tom Polanic (Michigan)
D: Wayne Smith (Denver)
F: Andy Herrebout (Denver)
F: Bill Staub (Denver)
F: Gordon Wilkie (Michigan)
* Most Outstanding Player(s)

Second Team
G: Bob Bellemore (Providence)
D: Jim Kenning (Denver)
D: Larry Kish (Providence)
D: Barry MacDonald (Michigan)
F: Mel Wakabayashi (Michigan)
F: Jerry Knightley (Rensselaer)
F: Jack Cole (Michigan)

References

Tournament
NCAA Division I men's ice hockey tournament
NCAA Men's Ice Hockey Tournament
NCAA Men's Ice Hockey Tournament
1960s in Denver
Ice hockey competitions in Denver